Erika Ayers (formerly Nardini) is an American businesswoman and CEO of the digital media company Barstool Sports. Since 2017, she has consistently been ranked as one of the most powerful executives in sports media.' Early life and education 
Ayers spent much of her childhood in New Hampshire and Vermont. She received a bachelor's degree in sociology from Colby College.

 Career 

 1998 - 2015: Early career, marketing 
Ayers began her career working at the legal department of Fidelity Investments, before switching to marketing. She was the senior vice president of sales and marketing at Demand Media. Prior to that, she held executive marketing positions at Yahoo! and Microsoft. From 2013 to 2015, she was the Chief Marketing Officer of AOL.

 2016 - present: CEO of Barstool Sports 
In 2016, Ayers was named the CEO of Barstool Sports. Ayers oversaw the company's expansion into multimedia, merchandising, streaming and pay-per-view programming. The company's expansion into pay-per-view included the acquisition of amateur boxing league Rough N' Rowdy in 2017.

The valuation of Barstool Sports doubled from $15 million to $30 million during her first year as CEO. It grew to $100 million in 2018. In 2018, Fast Company named Ayers as one of its "Most Creative People in Business", citing Barstool Sports' expansion into multimedia and merchandising during her tenure. That same year, Forbes ranked her 25th on its "Most Powerful Women In U.S. Sports".

In 2019, she was ranked as #19 on The Big Lead's list of "The 75 Most Powerful People in the Sports Media Business." That year, she was included on Crain's New York's "Notable Women in the Business of Sports". Adweek named Ayers as one of its "Most Powerful Women in Sports" in 2017 and 2020.

In 2020, Ayers was elected to the WWE's board of directors and resigned from that position in September 2022. Erika was also on the board of directors at Torchy's Tacos.

In an interview with Digiday'', Ayers discussed Barstool Sports' growth during her tenure, from a valuation of $15 million in 2016 to $450 million in 2020. In September 2021, Ayers stated that the company's revenue was expected to exceed $200 million in revenue, doubling the company's $100 million revenue in 2020.

In 2022, under Erika’s leadership, Barstool Sports progressed more into live sports and streaming  by hosting and broadcasting its first College Basketball Invitational  and the first Barstool Sports Arizona Bowl. 

In 2022, Barstool Sports also launched its NIL marketplace platform, TwoYay, which connects college athletes directly to advertisers. 

In March 2022, Erika joined the board of directors for the Premier Lacrosse League.

Ayers has been named Forbes’ Most Powerful Women in Sports, recipient of Crain’s Notable Women in Sports, AdWeek’s Most Powerful Women in Sports, Cynopsis’ Top Women in Media, and a top player in the U.S. Betting Space and Podcasting by Business Insider.

Podcast host and public speaking 
Ayers hosts Token CEO, a podcast about business and sports news. She was an early supporter of the Premier Hockey Federation (then National Women's Hockey League), and interviewed NWHL players Kelly Babstock and Rebecca Russo on her podcast.

She is a frequent public speaker, and has given talks at the Milken Institute, CAA World Congress, the MIT Sloan Sports Conference, the SALT Conference, and G2E Las Vegas.

 

 

 </ref> In 2020, she spoke at Barrett Sports Media's annual summit.

References 

Barstool Sports people
Colby College alumni
American women chief executives
American marketing businesspeople
Living people
1975 births